Rio Grande Detention Center is a privately owned prison for men located in Laredo, Webb County, Texas, operated by GEO Group under contract with the U.S. government Office of the Federal Detention Trustee.  The prison was originally built in 2007, opened in 2008, and has an official capacity of 1900 federal detainees awaiting trial.

The facility stands about 500 feet from the Rio Grande.

References

Prisons in Texas
Buildings and structures in Webb County, Texas
GEO Group
2008 establishments in Texas